Sir William Appleton  (3 September 1889 – 22 October 1958) was a New Zealand local body politician, advertising agent and leading company director. He was Mayor of Wellington for two terms from 1944 to 1950 after serving as a city councillor from 1931 to 1944. He was knighted in 1950.

Biography

Early life and career
Appleton was born in Alexandra in Central Otago in 1889, the eldest of nine children. His parents were Yorkshireman Edwin Appleton and his Scottish wife, Margaret Bruce. The Appleton family briefly moved to Gisborne in 1904 but was back in Alexandra in the following year. Appleton, left by the postmaster in charge of the local post office as a teenager, did some bookkeeping for local businesses. In October 1906, aged 17, he was appointed a cadet in the accountancy department of the General Post Office at Wellington. In 1909 he passed his accountancy exams.

He left the Post and Telegraph Department, then still a centre of modern communications technology, and in April 1910 joined advertising agent Charles Haines and Co. Haines had founded his business, the country's first advertising agency, in Wellington in 1891. Will married Mary Helen (Nell) Munro in March 1913. They were to have a daughter and two sons. By the time of the first world war 25-year-old Will Appleton was manager of Charles Haines. He was appointed managing director in 1918. Nell died in 1918's influenza epidemic. The following year he married Rose Hellewell and they had a daughter and two sons.

Meanwhile, Appleton maintained his local body interests serving on the Wellington Hospital Board from 1923. In 1931 he successfully stood for the Wellington City Council. Then in 1932 he sold his interest in Charles Haines to his former partners, accepted directorships in many major listed companies and devoted himself to politics.

Political career

Local politics

After moving to Wellington, Appleton was elected to the Onslow Borough Council in 1915 where he led a successful campaign for amalgamation with Wellington in order to gain an integrated water and drainage system. In 1923 he was elected to the Wellington Hospital Board on a Civic League ticket and remained a member until 1929.

In 1931 Appleton was elected to the Wellington City Council where he became an effective and popular councillor renowned as being friendly, approachable and possessing a "chuckling" sense of humour. He became chair of the Works Committee and oversaw the introduction of a system of refuse disposal to converted gullies into sports grounds including Appleton Park, which was named after him.

In 1944 Appleton challenged Thomas Hislop for the Citizens' nomination to stand for mayor. Appleton claimed he would stand as an independent should he not be granted the candidacy. Declining arbitration, Appleton got his wish when Hislop (albeit reluctantly) agreed to stand aside in the interests of unity. Appleton was elected with a huge majority and was later re-elected for a second term in 1947 by a lower margin before retiring in 1950. In a 1955 by-election Appleton was invited by the Citizens' Association to stand once again for the City Council, though he declined to re-enter local politics.

Appleton served for 21 years as a member of the Wellington Harbour Board, representing Wellington City, and was its chairman for 3 of those years (1954–57).

National politics
He unsuccessfully stood for Parliament several times. In the  standing for the National Party in the  electorate, he came second but was beaten by Labour's Peter Fraser. He was to stand against Fraser again in the cancelled 1941 general election.

Later life and death
Appleton was president of the Wellington Rugby Football League from 1940 to 1958 and presented the Appleton Shield, which is used to this day as the premier club trophy. In the 1950 King's Birthday Honours, Appleton was appointed a Knight Bachelor, in recognition of his service as mayor of Wellington. In 1953 he was made a Knight of Grace of the Order of St John, and was awarded the Queen Elizabeth II Coronation Medal. Rose Appleton was appointed a Member of the Order of the British Empire in the 1946 New Zealand Honours, and a Commander of the Order of St John in 1958.

Appleton died of cancer in Bowen Hospital, Wellington, on 22 October 1958. Lady Appleton died in 1980.

His son, Lloyd James Appleton (1923–1985), was a newspaper editor and was elected mayor of Dannevirke in 1965. In the 1971 New Year Honours, he was appointed a Member of the Order of the British Empire, for services to local government and journalism.

References

Further reading

No Mean City by Stuart Perry (1969, Wellington City Council) includes a paragraph and a portrait or photo for each mayor.

External links

 Images of Sir William Appleton at the National Library of New Zealand, many in the public domain
photo of Sir William Appleton (left) in 1950

|-

1889 births
1958 deaths
20th-century New Zealand businesspeople
Mayors of Wellington
Wellington City Councillors
Wellington Hospital Board members
New Zealand Knights Bachelor
New Zealand rugby league administrators
Unsuccessful candidates in the 1931 New Zealand general election
Unsuccessful candidates in the 1935 New Zealand general election
Unsuccessful candidates in the 1938 New Zealand general election
Unsuccessful candidates in the 1943 New Zealand general election
Unsuccessful candidates in the 1949 New Zealand general election
Candidates in the 1941 New Zealand general election
New Zealand Liberal Party politicians
New Zealand National Party politicians
Knights of Grace of the Order of St John
Wellington Harbour Board members
New Zealand politicians awarded knighthoods